Andrew Parsons   (born May 30, 1979) is a Canadian politician and lawyer, who was elected to the Newfoundland and Labrador House of Assembly in the 2011 provincial election.

A member of the Liberal Party of Newfoundland and Labrador, he represents the electoral district of Burgeo-La Poile. He is the Minister of Industry, Energy and Technology in Newfoundland and Labrador.

Born in Channel-Port Aux Basques, Parsons is the son of Kelvin Parsons, his predecessor as the district's MHA.

Background

Parsons earned a Bachelor of Arts from the University of New Brunswick before receiving a Bachelor of Laws from the University of Saskatchewan College of Law. While in University, Parsons was involved in various extracurricular activities and student associations.

After completing his Bachelor of Laws in 2004, Parsons was called to the Newfoundland and Labrador Bar in 2005, after articling with Ches Crosbie Barristers and Marks & Parsons Law Office.  Parsons served as an associate solicitor with Marks and Parsons Law Firm, a general practice located in Port aux Basques, NL.  Parsons is a member of the Law Society of NL, but took non-practicing status with the Law Society as of December 31, 2011. He is now practicing as the Attorney General of Newfoundland and Labrador.

Parsons was active within his community and surrounding area. He served on the executive of Port aux Basques Minor Hockey Association for 7 years, including 5 as President), ending in June 2011; served as a committee member for Port aux Basques Come Home Year 2005; served as a member of the Southwest Coast Marine and Mountain Zone Committee, and is currently a board member on the Dr. Charles L. Legrow Health Care Foundation. A former President of the Port aux Basques & Area Chamber of Commerce, Parsons was also one of the people instrumental in reviving junior hockey in Port aux Basques, with the return of the Junior Mariners in 2009.

Parsons served as the chairperson of the Vancouver 2010 Olympic Torch Relay Committee. Parsons served as president of the Port aux Basques Minor Hockey Association for three years and also served as second vice-president two years before that. He was also an organizer of Port aux Basques' bid to become Hockeyville in 2008, the community placed third. Parsons won the Brian Wakelin Executive of the Year Award from Hockey Newfoundland and Labrador in 2008 and was a winner of the Hockey NL Meritorious Service award for 2010. Parsons was also recognized for his contribution to western Newfoundland when he was named to the Top 10 of the Western Star newspaper's top 40 under 40 list for 2010.

Political career
On October 11, 2011, Parsons was elected as the Member of the House of Assembly in the district of Burgeo-La Poile. He was sworn in by Justice Orsborn on October 27, 2011. He served as Official Opposition critic for Advanced Education and Skills; Child, Youth and Family Services; Health and Community Services; and Justice and Attorney General. He also serves as the Deputy Opposition House Leader.

On May 2, 2012, Parsons proposed a private members' resolution for a fixed House of Assembly schedule. The purpose was to establish some stability and semblance of regularity. In Newfoundland and Labrador there is no legislation governing the House of Assembly in terms of when it shall sit.

In the 2015 election Parsons received nearly 4,000 votes in his district (96.48 per cent of total votes) and no other candidate received more than 100 votes. This is a Canadian record (not including acclamations). He was appointed as Minister of Justice, Attorney General and Government House Leader in Newfoundland and Labrador. Early on in that role, he has worked toward establishing a Drug Treatment Court, expansion of the Family Violence Intervention Court, establishing a Serious Incident Response team as civilian oversight for police, and a pilot program for free legal advice for sexual assault complainants.

Parsons was re-elected in the 2019 provincial election. He subsequently returned to cabinet in the same portfolios. He resigned as Government House Leader in the House of Assembly in November 2019. On August 19, 2020, he was appointed Minister of Industry, Energy and Technology, and Attorney General in the Furey government.

He was re-elected in the 2021 provincial election.

Electoral record

|-

|-

|-

|}

|-

|-

|-

|}

References

Living people
Liberal Party of Newfoundland and Labrador MHAs
People from Channel-Port aux Basques
1979 births
21st-century Canadian politicians
Members of the Executive Council of Newfoundland and Labrador